Little America is an American anthology streaming television series produced for Apple TV+. It premiered on January 17, 2020. The series was renewed for a second season, which premiered on December 9, 2022.

Premise
Little America looks to "go beyond the headlines to look at the funny, romantic, heartfelt, inspiring and unexpected lives of immigrants in America, at a time when their stories are more relevant than ever."

Cast

The Manager
 Suraj Sharma as Kabir
 Eshan Inamdar as young Kabir
 Ishan Gandhi as preteen Kabir
 Sherilyn Fenn as Laura Bush
Priyanka Bose as Kabir's Mother

The Jaguar
 Jearnest Corchado as Marisol
 Melinna Bobadilla as Gloria
 John Ortiz as Squash Coach
 Jamie Gore Pawlik as Charlotte Ansley

The Cowboy
 Conphidance as Iwegbuna
 Tom McCarthy as Professor Robbins
 Chinaza Uche as Chioke
 Ebbe Bassey as Mma Udeh

The Silence
 Mélanie Laurent as Sylviane
 Zachary Quinto as Spiritual Leader
 Bill Heck as Jack
 Gavin Lee as Henry

The Baker
 Kemiyondo Coutinho as Beatrice
 Innocent Ekakitie as Brian
 Susan Basemera as Yuliana
 Philip Luswata as Beatrice's Father

The Grand Prize Expo Winners
 Angela Lin as Ai
 X. Lee as Bo
 Madeleine Chang as Cheng

The Rock
 Shaun Toub as Faraz
 Shila Vosough Ommi as Yasmin
 Justin Ahdoot as Behrad

The Son
 Haaz Sleiman as Rafiq
 Adam Ali as Zain
 Fahim Fazli as Taliban commander

Episodes

Season 1 (2020)

Season 2 (2022)

Production
On February 8, 2018, it was announced that Apple was developing a television series based on the true stories collection "Little America" featured in Epic Magazine. The show is set to be written by Lee Eisenberg, Kumail Nanjiani, and Emily V. Gordon, all of whom will also executive produce alongside Alan Yang, Joshuah Bearman, and Joshua Davis. Arthur Spector will act as co-executive producer. Production companies involved with the series include Universal Television. On June 19, 2018, it was announced that Apple had given the production a series order. The show began filming in New Jersey in early 2019; however, the eighth episode of the first season, "The Son" (which is about a gay asylum seeker from Syria), was shot in the Canadian province of Quebec because the American Executive Order 13780 prevented some of its actors from being able to enter the United States for filming.

The series was renewed for a second season in December 2019, prior to the series premiere. The second season premiered on December 9, 2022, with an eight episode season.

Reception
On Rotten Tomatoes, the series has a 95% rating with an average score of 8.92 out of 10 based on 37 reviews. The site's critical consensus is, "Joyous, heartfelt, and very human, Little America's thoughtful collection of immigrant tales is as inspirational as it is relatable." On Metacritic, it has a score of 85 out of 100 based on 20 reviews, indicating "universal acclaim".

Accolades

References

External links
 – official site

2020 American television series debuts
2020s American comedy television series
Apple TV+ original programming
English-language television shows
Television series by Universal Television
2020s American anthology television series
Works about immigration to the United States
Television shows based on magazines
Television productions suspended due to the COVID-19 pandemic
Television shows filmed in New Jersey
Television shows filmed in Quebec